Mount Hope is a neighborhood in northern Providence, Rhode Island.  It is one of six neighborhoods comprising the East Side of Providence.  The area is bounded to the north by Rochambeau Avenue, to the east by Hope Street, to the south by Olney Street, while the western border is the former New York-New Haven Railroad (now Amtrak and MBTA) and Interstate 95.  

Camp Street is often used as a landmark for the neighborhood, as it runs lengthwise through Mount Hope's center. The area includes the North Burial Ground. 

The neighborhood is 44.5% non-Hispanic White, 29.4% African-American, and 10.4% Hispanic. Median household income is $28,413, and median family income is $35,476. 24.0% of families live below the poverty line.

Gallery

References

Neighborhoods in Providence, Rhode Island